USE or U.S.E. may refer to:
United States of Europe, hypothetical scenario of a single sovereign country in Europe
United State of Electronica, an American rock band
U.S.E. (album), by United State of Electronica
Uganda Securities Exchange, the principal stock exchange in Uganda
USE Method, a systems performance methodology by Brendan Gregg
Union State of Eurasia, an intergovernmental organisation in Europe and Asia
Unified State Exam, a series of university entrance exams in Russia

See also
Use (disambiguation)